The 2016 Virginia Democratic presidential primary took place on March 1 in the U.S. state of Virginia as one of the Democratic Party's primaries ahead of the 2016 presidential election.

On the same day, dubbed "Super Tuesday," Democratic primaries were held in ten other states plus American Samoa, while the Republican Party held primaries in eleven states including their own Virginia primary.

Opinion polling

Results

Primary date: March 1, 2016
National delegates: 95

Results by county/Independent cities

Analysis 
After losing the state badly to Barack Obama in 2008, Hillary Clinton won Virginia by 29 points against Bernie Sanders in 2016. Her victory was primarily delivered by African Americans who backed Clinton 84-16, and women, who backed Clinton over Sanders by a margin of 70-30. Clinton also won the white vote in Virginia, 57-42, which comprised 63% of the electorate in the State. Clinton swept all income levels and educational attainment levels.

Clinton won most of the major cities in Virginia. She won Alexandria and Fairfax by a wide margin. She also won the D.C. suburbs as a whole, 65-35. This region has a large population of college-educated whites as well as African Americans. Clinton won the Northern Virginia Exurbs 60-40. She performed well in more rural Central Virginia and western Virginia including the Shenandoah Valley, winning 54-43 over Bernie Sanders and carrying the city of Roanoke. Clinton also won the eastern region of Virginia, including the major city of Richmond, by a margin of 66-34. She won in the Tidewater region of Virginia 72-28.

References

Virginia
Democratic primary
2016
March 2016 events in the United States